Gibberula isinbayevae is a species of sea snail, a marine gastropod mollusk, in the family Cystiscidae. It is named after Russian athlete Yelena Isinbayeva.

Description
The length of the shell attains 1.8 mm.

Distribution
This species occurs off Guadeloupe.

References

isinbayevae
Gastropods described in 2015